In music history, the Neapolitan School is a group, associated with opera, of 17th and 18th-century composers who studied or worked in Naples, Italy, the best known of whom is Alessandro Scarlatti, with whom "modern opera begins". Francesco Provenzale is generally considered the school's founder. Others significant composers of this school are Giambattista Pergolesi, Domenico Cimarosa and Giovanni Paisiello.

The Neapolitan School has been considered in between the Roman School and the Venetian School in importance.

However, "The concept of Neapolitan school, or more particularly Neapolitan opera, has been questioned by a number of scholars. That Naples was a significant musical center in the 18th century is beyond doubt. Whether the composers working in Naples at that time developed or partook of a distinct and characteristic musical style is less clear" since so little is known about the repertory.

Members
Pietro Marchitelli (1643 -1729)
Francesco Provenzale (1624–1704)
 Alessandro Scarlatti (1660–1725)
 Francesco Durante (1684–1755)
 Nicola Porpora (1686–1768)
 Leonardo Vinci (1690–1730)
 Francesco Feo (1691–1761)
 Leonardo Leo (1694–1744)
 Giovanni Battista Pergolesi (1710–1736)
 Niccolò Jommelli (1714–1774)
 Tommaso Traetta (1727–1779)
 Niccolò Piccinni (1728–1800)
 Gian Francesco de Majo (1732–1770)
 Giovanni Paisiello (1740–1816)
 Domenico Cimarosa (1749–1801)
 Giovanni Salvatore (1611-1688)
 Donato Ricchezza (1648-1716)
 Gennaro Ursino (1650-?)
 Andrea Perrucci (1651-1704)
 Gaetano Greco (1657circa-1728)
 Gaetano Veneziano (1665-1716)
 Francesco Mancini (1672-1737)
 Nicola Fago (1677-1745)
 Domenico Sarro (1679-1744)
 Giuseppe Porsile (1680-1750)
 Angelo Ragazzi (1680-1750)
 Giovanni Veneziano (1683-1742)
 Domenico Scarlatti (1685-1757)
 Giacomo Sarcuni (1690 - 1758)
 Michele Caballone (1692-1740)
 Antonio Palella (1692-1761)
 Giuseppe de Majo (1697-1771)
 Pietro Auletta (1698 circa-1771)
 Nicola Bonifacio Logroscino (1698-1765 circa)
 Giuseppe Sellitto (1700-1777)
 Lorenzo Fago (1704-1793)
 Pietro Domenico Paradies (1707-1791)
 Egidio Romualdo Duni (1708-1775)
 Francesco Araja (1709-1770 circa)
 Gaetano Latilla (1711-1788)
 Nicola Sala (1713-1801)
 Girolamo Abos (1715-1760)
 Nicola Fiorenza (?-1764)
 Gennaro Manna (1715-1779)
 Pasquale Cafaro (1715-1783)
 Ignazio Fiorillo (1715-1787)
 Nicola Conforto (1718-1793)
 Giuseppe Scarlatti (1718 or 1723-1777)
 Antonio Corbisiero (1720-1790)
 Gregorio Sciroli (1722-1781)
 Alessandro Speranza (1724-1797)
 Domenico Fischietti (1725-1810)
 Gaspare Gabellone (1727-1796)
 Pasquale Anfossi (1727-1797)
 Pietro Alessandro Guglielmi (1728-1804)
 Giacomo Insanguine (1728-1793)
 Antonio Sacchini (1730-1786)
 Tommaso Giordani (1730 circa-1806)
 Fedele Fenaroli (1730-1818)
 Francesco Corbisieri (1733 circa-1802)
 Giacomo Tritto (1733-1824)
 Mattia Vento (1735-1776)
 Pasquale Fago (1740-1994)
 Gennaro Astarita (1749-1805)
 Giuseppe Giordani (1751-1798)
 Gaetano Manna (1751-1804)
 Giuseppe Curcio (1752-1832)
 Nicola Antonio Zingarelli (1752-1837)
 Gaetano Marinelli (1754-1820 circa)
 Luigi Caruso (1754-1823)
 Silvestro Palma (1754-1834)
 Gaetano Andreozzi (1755-1826)
 Angelo Tarchi (1760 circa-1814)
 Giuseppe Mosca (1772-1839)
 Luigi Mosca (1775-1824)
 Vincenzo Lavigna (1776-1836)
 Carlo Coccia (1782-1873)
 Giacomo Cordella (1786-1847)
 Nicola Manfroce (1791-1813)

See also
Neapolitan chord
Neapolitan scale
Monophony
Polyphony

Sources

 
 
 
 
Composition schools
Music in Naples